Jane Ellen Swagerty (born July 30, 1951), later known by her married name Jane Hill, is an American former competition swimmer and Olympic medalist.  Swagerty represented the United States as a 17-year-old at the 1968 Summer Olympics in Mexico City.  She received a bronze medal for her third-place performance in the women's 100-meter backstroke (1:08.1), finishing behind fellow American Kaye Hall (1:06.2) and Canadian Elaine Tanner (1:06.7).  She also swam the backstroke leg in the preliminary heats of the women's 100-meter medley relay for the gold medal-winning U.S. team, but did not receive a medal under the 1968 international swimming rules because she did not swim in the event final.

See also
 List of Olympic medalists in swimming (women)
 List of University of the Pacific (United States) people

References

External links
 

1951 births
Living people
People from Oakdale, California
American female backstroke swimmers
Medalists at the 1968 Summer Olympics
Olympic bronze medalists for the United States in swimming
Pacific Tigers women's swimmers
Swimmers at the 1968 Summer Olympics